K. J. Somaiya Medical College & Research Centre is a trust medical college in the heart of Mumbai, Maharashtra, India. The college was founded by Karamshi Jethabhai Somaiya and run by Somaiya trust. It has 50 undergraduate seats for MBBS matriculants.

It is situated in the Somaiya Ayurvihar Complex, a 22.5 acre campus located in central Mumbai. It is currently managed by the Somaiya Trust. The Charitable hospital is also a quarantine facility for COVID-19 patients.

References

External links
 

Universities and colleges in Mumbai
Affiliates of Maharashtra University of Health Sciences
Medical colleges in Maharashtra
Educational institutions established in 1991
1991 establishments in Maharashtra